Ivan Múdry (born 3 August 1992) is a Slovak football defender who currently plays for AFC Nové Mesto nad Váhom in the DOXXbet liga.

Club career

Spartak Myjava
He made his professional debut for Spartak Myjava against FK Dukla Banská Bystrica on 26 July 2014.

References

External links
 
 Eurofotbal profile
 Futbalnet profile

1992 births
Living people
Slovak footballers
Association football defenders
FK Dubnica players
Spartak Myjava players
AFC Nové Mesto nad Váhom players
Slovak Super Liga players